X Music Festival is a dance music festival held each June on the former grounds of Cardiff Castle in Wales.

References

External links

Music festivals in Wales
Summer events in Wales